Guy de Valle Flor (born 19 May 1920) is a Portuguese former sports shooter. He competed at the 1960 Summer Olympics and the 1964 Summer Olympics.

References

External links
  

1920 births
Possibly living people
Portuguese male sport shooters
Olympic shooters of Portugal
Shooters at the 1960 Summer Olympics
Shooters at the 1964 Summer Olympics
People from Pau, Pyrénées-Atlantiques
20th-century Portuguese people